Januária Airport  is the airport serving Januária, Brazil.

Airlines and destinations
No scheduled flights operate from this airport.

Access

See also

List of airports in Brazil

References

External links

Airports in Minas Gerais